Gölhisar District is a district of the Burdur Province of Turkey. Its seat is the town of Gölhisar. Its area is 494 km2, and its population is 23,064 (2021).

Geography
Gölhisar District is located in the Dalaman Stream Water Collection Basin at the foothills of the Western Taurus Mountains, 107 to Burdur, 111 to Denizli, 90 to Fethiye, 135 km to Antalya, southwest of Burdur. Its average altitude is 945 meters. The area is an important Ramsar Site. 

Gölhisar Plain is a sediment plain and is irrigated by the waters of Yapraklı Dam. Agriculture is important to the local economy with Beets, anise, cereals, vegetables and fruits being grown. The region contains the most important music and folklore cultures of the region.

Composition
There are two municipalities in Gölhisar District:
 Gölhisar
 Yusufça

There are 12 villages in Gölhisar District:

 Asmalı 
 Çamköy 
 Elmalıyurt 
 Evciler 
 Hisarardı 
 İbecik 
 Karapınar 
 Kargalı 
 Sorkun 
 Uylupınar 
 Yamadı 
 Yeşildere

References

Districts of Burdur Province